Remo Segnana (1925 – 16 June 2018) was an Italian politician who served as a Senator from 1968 to 1983.

References

1925 births
2018 deaths
Senators of Legislature V of Italy
Senators of Legislature VI of Italy
Senators of Legislature VII of Italy
Senators of Legislature VIII of Italy
Members of the Regional Council of Trentino-Alto Adige
People from Borgo Valsugana